David Thorburn is an American professor of literature at the Massachusetts Institute of Technology who is notable for media studies, literary criticism, and teaching. He has published poetry in Slate Magazine, Threepenny Review, and The Atlantic. He was one of the first academics to study the medium of television as an academic field of inquiry. He is the director of MIT's Communications Forum. He is regarded as an authority on modernist literature, and he was selected by the Teaching Company to teach a course on entitled Masterworks of Early 20th-Century Literature.

Early years 
Thorburn received a bachelor's degree from Princeton and an MA and PhD from Stanford and taught at Yale. A student, Thomas E. Ricks, described Professor Thorburn as a challenging and thought-provoking teacher, remembering that one of his challenges——to tell why Mickey Spillane's I, the Jury was not a great novel——was one of the "best assessments" he ever got during his studies there.<ref>Thomas E. Ricks, April 20, 2009, The Washington Post, Outlook: Shut Down West Point, Annapolis, Air Force Academy, Accessed Aug. 22, 2013, ...Prof. David Thorburn ... Here's a challenge--tell my why Mickey Spillane's 'I, the Jury' is NOT a great novel..."</ref> After ten years at Yale, he joined the faculty of MIT in the literature department. His research interests included modernist writers such as Joseph Conrad, D. H. Lawrence, and James Joyce as well as later writers such as John Updike. His fiction anthology entitled Initiation; stories and short novels on three themes became a popular source for high school and college students.

 Media studies 

Thorburn joined MIT in 1976. He was the founder and first director of the MIT Film and Media Studies program which is now known as the Comparative Media Studies program. In 1996, he became director of MIT's Communications Forum, which sponsors panel discussions with particular focus on how communications are affected by politics and culture, with special attention to emerging technologies such as the Internet. As director of MIT's Communications Forum, Thorburn helped bring conferences on controversial topics to MIT, such as the views of V. A. Shiva Ayyadurai regarding the future of the U. S. Post Office, as well as the fate of the newspaper industry in the digital age, and copyright issues featuring Richard Stallman. He brought television writer David Milch, who served as a writer and producer on Hill Street Blues, to a class he taught on the media. He suggested in a 1977 critique in the Georgia Review that television drama should be studied with the "same care and attentiveness we bring to the study of literature, music and film." Regarding the future of newspapers, he forecast that national brands would survive but regional and local papers might have to struggle, although he remains optimistic about the possibilities of technology:

Thorburn is regarded as an authority on how media influences politics. His course American Television: A Cultural History, examined the medium in a context of humanism and, along with his essays, he was one of the first scholars to analyze television from a scholarly perspective. In 2008, he described the World Wide Web as not as powerful as traditional media such as television, although it was increasingly a major source of fund-raising for candidates. In an essay in The American Prospect, he wondered whether the human disposition to view new technologies through the use of metaphor might be limiting our understanding of the intrinsic qualities and possibilities of the Internet.

 Awards and honors 
Thorburn was awarded Fulbright, Woodrow Wilson, and Rockefeller foundation fellowships. He won MIT's highest teaching award, the MacVicar Faculty Fellow, in 2002.

 Scholarship and teaching 
Thorburn is a critic of over-analysis of literature with excessive focus on trivia.

 Publications 
 Henry Jenkins and David Thorburn, Democracy and New Media, MIT Press, 2004anthology, Google Books, Democracy and New Media, Accessed Aug. 22, 2013
 Rethinking Media Change, anthology, David Thorburn editor-in-chief, MIT Press.
 The Film Experience, MIT OpenCourseWare, lectures and teaching insights.
 Masterworks of Early 20th-Century Fiction, The Teaching Company, 2007
 David Thorburn, Howard Eiland, John Updike: a collection of critical essays, Prentice-Hall, 1979, 222 pages
 David Thorburn, Conrad's Romanticism Initiation; stories and short novels on three themes'', edited by David Thorburn, an anthology of fiction. Harcourt, Brace, Jovanovich, .

References

External links
 The Film Experience, MIT OpenCourseWare.

 

American mass media scholars
MIT School of Humanities, Arts, and Social Sciences faculty
Princeton University alumni
Stanford University alumni
American modernist poets
Literary critics of English
Living people
Year of birth missing (living people)